Mark may refer to:

Bible-New Testament
 Mark the Evangelist (5–68), traditionally ascribed author of the Gospel of Mark
 Gospel of Mark, one of the four canonical gospels and one of the three synoptic gospels

Currency
 Bosnia and Herzegovina convertible mark, the currency of Bosnia and Herzegovina
 East German mark, the currency of the German Democratic Republic
 Estonian mark, the currency of Estonia between 1918 and 1927
 Finnish markka, the currency of Finland from 1860 until 28 February 2002
 Mark (currency), a currency or unit of account in many nations
 Polish mark, the currency of the Kingdom of Poland and of the Republic of Poland between 1917 and 1924

German
 Deutsche Mark, the official currency of West Germany from 1948 until 1990 and later the unified Germany from 1990 until 2002
 German gold mark, the currency used in the German Empire from 1873 to 1914
 German Papiermark, the German currency from 4 August 1914
 German rentenmark, a currency issued on 15 November 1923 to stop the hyperinflation of 1922 and 1923 in Weimar Germany
 Lodz Ghetto mark, a special currency for Lodz Ghetto.
 Reichsmark, the currency in Germany from 1924 until 20 June 1948 in West Germany

People
 John Mark (died 1st century), assistant accompanying Paul and Barnabas in the Acts of the Apostles, identified as Mark the Evangelist
 Mark the Evangelist (5–68), traditionally ascribed author of the Gospel of Mark
 Mark of Cornwall, king of Kernow
 Pope Mark (died 336), Pope of the Catholic Church from 18 January to 7 October 336

 Mark (given name), a male given name, includes a list of notable people with the name
 Mark (surname), includes a list of notable people with the name

Places 
 Mereg (also Mark), a village in Sarkal Rural District, in the Central District of Marivan County, Kurdistan Province, Iran

Europe
 Amt Dahme/Mark a collective municipality in the district of Teltow-Fläming in Brandenburg, Germany
 Amt Lindow (Mark), a collective municipality in the district of Ostprignitz-Ruppin in Brandenburg, Germany
 Baruth/Mark, a town in the Teltow-Fläming district of Brandenburg, Germany
 County of Mark, a county and state of the Holy Roman Empire in the Lower Rhenish–Westphalian Circle
 Friesack/Mark, a town in the Havelland district in Brandenburg, Germany
 Mark (Dender), a river in Belgium
 Mark (Dintel), a river in Belgium and the Netherlands
 Mark Hundred, a Västergötland hundred in Sweden
 Mark Municipality, a municipality in Västra Götaland County in southwest Sweden
 Mark, Somerset, an English village and civil parish
 Mark Lane, a road in London

United States
 Mark, Illinois, a village in Putnam County, Illinois
 Mark, Missouri, an extinct town in Marion County, in the U.S. state of Missouri

Sports

 Mark, a term used in professional wrestling with multiple meanings
 Mark (Australian rules football), where a player cleanly catches a kicked ball that has travelled more than 15 metres without anyone else touching it 
 Mark (rugby), a play in which a player may catch the ball and take a free-kick at the position of the mark

Other
 March (territory) (also mark), a medieval European term for any kind of borderland
 , an HTML element used for highlighting relevant text in a quotation
 Mark, the victim of a confidence trick
 Mark (designation), a method of designating a version of a product
 Mark (dinghy), a single-hander class of small sailing dinghy
 Mark (unit), a medieval weight or mass unit that supplanted the pound weight as a precious metals and coinage weight from the 11th century
 , vessel of the US Army and the US & Taiwanese Navies
 Mark and space, terms used in telecommunications to describe two different signal states of a signal

See also
 
 
 Marked (disambiguation)
 Marc (disambiguation)
 The Mark (disambiguation)
 Marker (disambiguation)
 Marking (disambiguation)
 Marks (disambiguation)
 Marque (disambiguation)
 St. Mark's (disambiguation)